Maudrie M. Walton Elementary School is a public elementary school in Stop Six, Fort Worth, Texas. It is a part of the Fort Worth Independent School District.

The school serves area public housing. It previously had a reputation as among the lowest performing schools in Fort Worth, but by the early 2000s had among the highest rankings. Walton had gotten the "recognized" ranking from the Texas Education Agency (TEA). The school used the "Reading Mastery" program to increase its test scores.

In 2003 PBS released a documentary called A Tale of Two Schools which features the school's reputational growth and educational methods used from fall 2000 to spring 2001, along that with those of R. H. Bearden Elementary School in Tallahatchie County, Mississippi.

References

External links
Maudrie M. Walton Elementary School

Fort Worth Independent School District schools
Public elementary schools in Texas
Public schools in Fort Worth, Texas